Late Bloomer is a 2004 Japanese film by Go Shibata, about a handicapped serial killer named Sumida.

Plot
Sumida is disabled with cerebral palsy, but all he wants is to hang out with his friends and enjoy beer, rock and roll, and women. When his best friend steals his secret love, he embarks upon a cold-blooded rampage of revenge.

References

External links

2004 drama films
2004 films
2000s Japanese-language films
Japanese films about revenge
Japanese serial killer films
2000s Japanese films